Dogs Blood Rising is an early studio recording, LP record / album released by the English independent music group Current 93.

Pressings
1984 12" black vinyl in regular sleeve (L.A.Y.L.A.H. Antirecords LAY8)
1985 cassette in regular cassette box (Mi-Mort MM6)
1988 12" black vinyl in regular sleeve (2nd pressing) (L.A.Y.L.A.H. Antirecords LAY8)
1988 CD in jewel case (L.A.Y.L.A.H. Antirecords LAYCD8)
1995 CD in jewel case (Durtro DURTRO027CD)

Track listing

Original LP
A

 "Christus Christus the Shells Have Cracked"
 "Falling Back in Fields of Rape"

B

 "From Broken Cross, Locusts"
 "Raio No Terrasu (Jesus Wept)"
 "St. Peters Keys All Bloody"

Cassette
A

 "Christus Christus the Shells Have Cracked"
 "Falling Back in Fields of Rape"
 "Christ's First Howling"
 "Fields of Rape"

B

 "From Broken Cross, Locusts"
 "Raio No Terrasu (Jesus Wept)"
 "St. Peters Keys All Bloody"
 "I'm the One"

CD (L.A.Y.L.A.H. Antirecords)

 "Christus Christus the Shells Have Cracked" - 3:08
 "Falling Back in Fields of Rape" - 14:49
 "From Broken Cross, Locusts" - 6:12
 "Raio No Terrasu (Jesus Wept)" - 14:02
 "St. Peters Keys All Bloody" - 2:23

CD (Durtro)

 "Christus Christus the Shells Have Cracked" - 3:08
 "Falling Back in Fields of Rape" - 14:49
 "From Broken Cross, Locusts" - 6:12
 "Raio No Terrasu (Jesus Wept)" - 14:02
 "St. Peters Keys All Bloody" - 2:23
 "Dogs Blood Rising" - 4:58

Personnel
David Tibet
Steven Stapleton
John Murphy
Nick Rogers
Diana Rogerson
Steve Ignorant
Iggi
Tathata Wallis
Christ 777

References

1984 albums
Current 93 albums